María Teresa Torró Flor was the defending champion, but withdrew before the tournament began.
Elina Svitolina won the title, defeating Tímea Babos in the final, 7–5, 7–6(7–3).

Seeds

Draw

Finals

Top half

Bottom half

Qualifying

Seeds

Qualifiers

Lucky losers

Draw

First qualifier

Second qualifier

Third qualifier

Fourth qualifier

References 
 Main draw
 Qualifying draw

Grand Prix SAR La Princesse Lalla Meryem Singles
2015 Women's Singles
2015 in Moroccan tennis